is a junction passenger railway station and monorail station located in the city of Hino, Tokyo, jointly operated by the private railway operator Keio Corporation and the Tama Toshi Monorail. The station is next to Tama Zoo, from which it takes its name.

Lines

Station layout

Keio Corporation
The Keio station has one bay platform serving two tracks.

Tama Toshi Monorail
Tama-Dōbutsukōen Station is a raised station with two tracks and two opposed side platforms, with the station building located underneath. It is a standardized station building for this monorail line.

Platforms

History
The Keio station opened on 29 April 1964. The Tama Toshi Monorail station opened on 10 January 2000.

Station numbering was introduced to the Tama Toshi Monorail Line in February 2018 with the station being assigned station number TT05.

Passenger statistics
In fiscal 2019, the Keio station was used by an average of 6,073 passengers daily. During the same period, the Tama Monorail portion of the station was used by 2,308 passengers daily.

Surrounding area
The Keio Rail-Land railway museum is located adjacent to this station.

See also
List of railway stations in Japan

References

External links

 Keio station information 
 Tama Monorail Station Information 

Railway stations in Tokyo
Tama Toshi Monorail
Stations of Keio Corporation
Railway stations in Japan opened in 1964
Railway stations in Japan opened in 2000
Hino, Tokyo